The Metropolitan Cathedral of the Holy Savior is the cathedral church of the Catholic Archdiocese of San Salvador in San Salvador, El Salvador.

History
The Cathedral site is the place where the old Temple of Santo Domingo (dedicated to St. Dominic) once stood.  An even greater toll was exacted on Palm Sunday, March 30, 1980, during the funeral of Saint Óscar Romero (who was assassinated Monday, March 24, 1980, while celebrating Mass at a small chapel located in a hospital called "La Divina Providencia"), when 44 people were killed during a stampede after some elements, allegedly members of security forces (although it has never been corroborated) fired on mourners/worshippers and on Romero's funeral cortege, the real gunmen were never identified.  Later, the square in front of the cathedral was the site of rapturous celebrations after the signing of the Chapultepec Peace Accords that ended the Salvadoran Civil War in 1992.  The cathedral was completed and inaugurated on March 19, 1999, and finished off with a festive tiled facade by the Salvadoran master Fernando Llort.

The church was twice visited by Pope John Paul II who said that the cathedral was "intimately allied with the joys and hopes of the Salvadoran people."  During his visits in 1983 and 1996, the Pope knelt and prayed before the tomb of Archbishop Óscar Romero, assassinated in 1980, whose tomb here is a major pilgrim draw. President Barack Obama visited the cathedral and the tomb during his March 2011 trip to Latin America.

In late December 2012, the Archbishop of San Salvador, José Luis Escobar Alas, ordered the removal of the tiled ceramic mural facade of the cathedral without consulting the national government or the artist, the Salvadoran master Fernando Llort. Workers chipped off and destroyed all the 2,700 tiles of the mural.

Architecture and style
The festive and colorful facade surrounds a shrine to an image of the Divine Saviour of the World (Jesus, after the Transfiguration, the patron of El Salvador) sculpted by Friar Francisco Silvestre García in 1777. The main altar features an image of the Divine Saviour donated by the Holy Roman Emperor Charles V in 1546. The image rests on a four-column baldacchino surrounded by images of the prophets Moses and Elijah, who take part in the Transfiguration story. The main altar is surrounded by eight large paintings showing scenes from the life of Christ painted by Andrés García Ibáñez. Above it all, the bright Churrigueresque cupola stands 148 feet in height, with a 79-foot radius.

Footnotes

Roman Catholic cathedrals in El Salvador
Churches in San Salvador
Basilica churches in Central America
Roman Catholic churches completed in 1999
1842 establishments in El Salvador
20th-century Roman Catholic church buildings